Boven-Hardinxveld is a railway station, in Boven-Hardinxveld, Netherlands.

History
The station opened on 16 Jul 1885 as Buldersteeg. It was renamed Boven-Hardinxveld on 15 May 1927. The station was closed on 15 May 1934, but reopened on 16 April 2012. The station lies on the MerwedeLingelijn (Dordrecht - Geldermalsen). The station is primarily for Hardinxveld and small settlements in the area. Trains can pass each other here, the station has a double track . Train services are operated by Qbuzz.

Train services

Bus services

External links
Qbuzz website 
Dutch Public Transport journey planner

Notes

Railway stations in South Holland
Railway stations opened in 2012
Hardinxveld-Giessendam